The 2002 MBNA Platinum 400 was a NASCAR Winston Cup Series racing event that was held on June 2, 2002, at Dover International Speedway in Dover, Delaware.

Tony Raines would start his NASCAR Cup Series career during this event while Dick Trickle and Chad Little would end theirs after this race.

Race report
There were 43 drivers on the starting grid; all of them were born in the United States of America. Derrike Cope, Hermie Sadler, and Randy Renfrow failed to qualify for this race. Joe Nemechek was credited as the last-place finisher due to a crash on lap 42. This racing event lasted for 400 laps and Jimmie Johnson defeated Bill Elliott by almost half a second. Matt Kenseth would clinch his first ever pole position start by driving up to  during his solo qualifying run.

The race itself would last approximately three hours and twenty-four minutes; the green flag was officially waved at 1:00 PM Eastern Daylight Saving Time while the checkered flag came at approximately 4:24 PM EDT. Any yellow flags in this race were caused by accidents, debris, and an oil spill on lap 373. About 40 laps of this race were done under caution with each green flag session lasting an average of 45 laps. Ricky Rudd, Bill Elliott, John Andretti, and Mark Martin would jointly lead the first 100 laps while the last 100 laps saw the first-place position of the race split between Ricky Rudd and eventual race winner Jimmie Johnson. Sterling Marlin kept his championship lead after this racing event. Only time in Cup when BACE Motorsports fielded two Cup entries. Pretty gutsy move considering their financial situation. 

Winnings for this racing event varied from $56,712 ($ when adjusted for inflation) to $152,400 ($ when adjusted for inflation).

The overall racing purse for this event added up to $3,450,082 ($ when adjusted for inflation).

Qualifying

Top 10 finishers

Timeline
Section reference: 
 Start of race: Matt Kenseth started the race with the pole position but quickly lost it to Ricky Rudd.
 Lap 19: Caution due to debris; green flag racing on lap 22.
 Lap 42: Joe Nemechek had a terminal crash; forcing him to become the last-place finisher.
 Lap 44: Caution due to Joe Nemechek and Todd Bodine's accident; green flag racing on lap 50.
 Lap 48: Mark Martin took over the lead from Ricky Rudd before being overtaken by Jimmie Johnson on lap 125.
 Lap 126: Caution due to a 3-car accident; green flag racing on lap 136.
 Lap 144: Jimmie Johnson took over the lead from Jeff Gordon before being overtaken by Ricky Craven on lap 217.
 Lap 170: A fuel pump issue forced Dick Trickle out of the race for the day.
 Lap 216: Caution due to Matt Kenseth's accident; green flag racing resumed on lap 220.
 Lap 218: Jimmie Johnson took over the lead from Ricky Craven before being overtaken by Dale Jarrett on lap 293.
 Lap 283: Mark Martin had a terminal crash; ending his day on the track.
 Lap 292: Caution due to Jeff Green's accident; green flag racing resumed on lap 297.
 Lap 307: Caution due to debris; green flag racing on lap 311.
 Lap 308: Ricky Rudd took over the lead from Dale Jarrett before being overtaken by Jimmie Johnson on lap 363.
 Lap 370: Ken Schrader had a terminal crash; bringing his NASCAR race weekend to an early end.
 Lap 373: Caution due to oil on track; green flag racing on lap 378.
 Finish: Jimmie Johnson was officially declared the winner of the event.

Standings after the race

References

MBNA Platinum 400
MBNA Platinum 400
NASCAR races at Dover Motor Speedway